The 2015 Limerick Premier Intermediate Hurling Championship was the second staging of the Limerick Premier Intermediate Hurling Championship since its establishment by the Limerick County Board in 2014.

On 24 October 2015, Bruree won the championship after a 3-07 to 0-13 defeat of Knockainey in the final at FitzGerald Park, Kilmallock. It was their first ever championship title in this grade.

Results

Final

References

External links

 Limerick GAA website

Limerick Premier Intermediate Hurling Championship
Limerick Premier Intermediate Hurling Championship